Carlo Somigliana (20 September 1860 – 20 June 1955) was an Italian mathematician and a classical mathematical physicist, faithful member of the school of Enrico Betti and Eugenio Beltrami. He made important contributions to linear elasticity: the Somigliana integral equation, analogous to Green's formula in potential theory, and the Somigliana dislocations are named after him. Other fields he contribute to include seismic wave propagation, gravimetry and glaciology. One of his ancestors was Alessandro Volta: precisely, the great Como physicist was an ancestor of Carlo's mother, Teresa Volta.

Life and career
Carlo Somigliana began his university studies in Pavia, where he was a student of Eugenio Beltrami. Later he moved to Pisa and had Betti among his teachers: in Pisa he established a lifelong friendship with Vito Volterra, who was one of his classmates, lasted until the death of the latter. He graduated from Scuola Normale Superiore di Pisa in 1881. In 1887 Somigliana began teaching as an assistant at the University of Pavia. In 1892, as the result of a competitive examination, he was appointed as University Professor of Mathematical Physics. Somigliana was called to Turin University in 1903, to hold the Chair of Mathematical Physics: He held the position until his retirement in 1935, and then he moved to Milan to live there. During the World War II, his Milan apartment was destroyed, and he moved to his family villa in Casanova Lanza: though he retired from all his teaching duties after 1935, he did scientific research until close to his death in 1955.

Honors
On the July 20, 1897, he was elected corresponding member of the Accademia Nazionale dei Lincei: subsequently, on 17 September 1908, he was elected national member. On January 18, 1939, he was elected member of the Pontifical Academy of Sciences.

Selected publications

Historical, biographical and commemorative works
.
.
.
. The "Commemorative address pronounced on the occasion of the first seance of the sixth academic year, on the 30th of November 1941" (English translation of the title) by Carlo Somigliana, colleague and friend of Vito Volterra.

See also
Boundary element method
Somigliana equation

Notes

References

Biographical and general references
. The "Yearbook" of the renowned Italian scientific institution, including an historical sketch of its history, the list of all past and present members as well as a wealth of information about its academic and scientific activities.
. The "Obituary of Carlo Somigliana".
. "The Italian contribution to the mathematical theory of elasticity" is a survey paper describing the Italian contributions to the field of elasticity, including brief sketches of the biographies of the main scientists involved.
.
. Available from the website of the.

Scientific references
.
 .

External links
Carlo Somigliana at the Academy of Sciences of Turin
Carlo Somigliana at the Pontifical Academy of Sciences

1860 births
1955 deaths
19th-century Italian mathematicians
20th-century Italian mathematicians
Mathematical physicists
Members of the Pontifical Academy of Sciences
Academic staff of the University of Turin